The 2009–10 All-Ireland Intermediate Club Football Championship was the seventh staging of the All-Ireland Intermediate Club Football Championship since its establishment by the Gaelic Athletic Association for the 2003–04 season.

The All-Ireland final was played on 14 February 2010 at Croke Park in Dublin, between Cookstown Fr. Rock's and Spa. Cookstown Fr. Rock's won the match by 1-07 to 0-08 to claim their first ever championship title.

References

2009 in Irish sport
2010 in Irish sport
All-Ireland Intermediate Club Football Championship
All-Ireland Intermediate Club Football Championship